Pacullidae is a family of araneomorph spiders first described by Eugène Simon in 1894. It was merged into Tetrablemmidae in 1958, then raised back to family status after a large phylogenetic study in 2017.

Description
The family Pacullidae contains three-clawed spiders with six eyes, lacking a cribellum. They resemble spiders from the family Tetrablemmidae in some respects but are much larger, always exceeding 5 mm long, have a very wrinkled (rugose) cuticle, and females do not have large membranous receptacles.

Phylogeny
Pacullidae falls within the Synspermiata clade, a clade of former haplogyne spiders with "synsperm" – encapsulated groups of 2–4 fused sperm cells. Within this clade, it groups with four other families, including Tetrablemmidae, but is distinct from the latter, being most closely related to Diguetidae. Together with Pholcidae, these four families are placed in the "lost trachea clade", a group of families that have lost their posterior respiratory system.

Genera and species
, the World Spider Catalog accepts the following genera and species:
Lamania Lehtinen, 1981
Lamania bernhardi (Deeleman-Reinhold, 1980) — Borneo
Lamania bokor Schwendinger & Košulič, 2015 — Cambodia
Lamania gracilis Schwendinger, 1989 — Bali
Lamania inornata (Deeleman-Reinhold, 1980) — Borneo
Lamania kraui (Shear, 1978) — Thailand, Malaysia
Lamania lipsae Dierkens, 2011 — Borneo
Lamania nirmala Lehtinen, 1981 — Borneo
Lamania sheari (Brignoli, 1980) — Indonesia (Sulawesi)
Paculla Simon, 1887
Paculla bukittimahensis Lin & Li, 2017 — Singapore
Paculla cameronensis Shear, 1978 — Malaysia
Paculla globosa Lin & Li, 2017 — Singapore
Paculla granulosa (Thorell, 1881) — New Guinea
Paculla mului Bourne, 1981 — Borneo
Paculla negara Shear, 1978 — Malaysia
Paculla sulaimani Lehtinen, 1981 — Malaysia
Paculla wanlessi Bourne, 1981 — Borneo
Perania Thorell, 1890
Perania annam Schwendinger & Košulič, 2015 — Vietnam
Perania armata (Thorell, 1890) — Indonesia (Sumatra)
Perania birmanica (Thorell, 1898) — Myanmar
Perania cerastes Schwendinger, 1994 — Malaysia
Perania coryne Schwendinger, 1994 — Malaysia
Perania deelemanae Schwendinger, 2013 — Indonesia (Sumatra)
Perania egregia Schwendinger, 2013 — Thailand
Perania ferox Schwendinger, 2013 — Thailand
Perania harau Schwendinger, 2013 — Indonesia (Sumatra)
Perania korinchica Hogg, 1919 — Indonesia (Sumatra)
Perania nasicornis Schwendinger, 1994 — Thailand
Perania nasuta Schwendinger, 1989 — Thailand
Perania nigra (Thorell, 1890) — Indonesia (Sumatra)
Perania picea (Thorell, 1890) — Indonesia (Sumatra)
Perania quadrifurcata Schwendinger, 2013 — Thailand
Perania robusta Schwendinger, 1989 — China, Thailand
Perania selatan Schwendinger, 2013 — Indonesia (Sumatra)
Perania siamensis Schwendinger, 1994 — Thailand
Perania tumida Schwendinger, 2013 — Thailand
Perania utara Schwendinger, 2013 — Indonesia (Sumatra)
Sabahya Deeleman-Reinhold, 1980
Sabahya bispinosa Deeleman-Reinhold, 1980 — Borneo
Sabahya kinabaluana Deeleman-Reinhold, 1980 — Borneo
†Furcembolus Wunderlich 2008 9 spp,  Burmese amber, Myanmar, Cenomanian

References

 
Araneomorphae families